Zuskamira is a genus of flies in the family Sepsidae.

Species
Zuskamira inexpectata Pont, 1987

References

Sepsidae
Diptera of Europe
Brachycera genera